Brett J.  Beyer (born 26 July 1966) is an Australian international sailing coach and world champion sailor.

Biography 
Beyer was born in Sydney, the youngest of three boys. He studied Sport Science at Wollongong University from 1985-1987.

Beyer's first major success as club, state, national and junior world champion in the Cherub class in 1983. He has been honoured as lifelong member with Woollahra Sailing Club on Sydney Harbour. Since 2000 he has been thrice nominated as "Yachtman of the year". In 2007, he was nominated as Master Athlete of the year. In 2014, he won his ninth World Championship. In 2015, he was nominated and won Sports NSW 'Master Athlete of 2014' amongst all sports in NSW.

His knowledge and commitment to the physical and mental requirements of elite competitive sports have held him in good stead for his own racing and ultimately, passing on those skills and knowledge to those aspiring for Olympic medals.

Beyer is known for a high standard of sportsmanship and athleticism, putting in many hours in practice sailing sessions and running innovative coaching programs. Beyer has achieved much success in the World Laser Masters Championship with ten gold medals, two silver and one bronze in the Apprentice and Master divisions since 2001. Brett Beyer has produced and lectured Level 2 and 3 coaching courses with an emphasis on the physiology involved in competitive sailing as well as the complex tactical strategies required for success. Brett has also contributed to ISAF Olympic Solidarity Courses around the world designed to assist developing nations to have sailing exposure.

Brett has also worked closely with premier sailing apparel manufacturer, Zhik, since its inception.
"I wanted Brett on the Zhik team when we first founded the business", said Brian Conolly. 
"I knew he would provide us with the most analytical mind in the business.  His feedback on product design has helped lead us to some great innovations.  He is also a most brilliant coach and highly regarded on the world circuit."

From 2000 he has spent a considerable part of his time internationally coaching the Olympic elite.
Beyer has been working with Singapore Olympic Laser team since 2003 and helped them secure Olympic representation in the Laser 
and Laser Radial classes for the 2004, 2008, 2012 and 2016 Olympic Games. He is now working freelance with several top sailors with the
mission of achieving a medal in 2016 and 2020 Olympics.

These days, Brett is running his independent elite Laser group that is committed to qualifying for the Olympic Games in RIO. (Update.....this has been achieved in 2014). He limits the group to 3 elite sailors that are invited to be full-time participants in his training and racing program. This consists of a 6-month European racing circuit and several months for the Australian and New Zealand circuits. Each sailor bring his own strength and talent to the team. Brett has now competed himself or coached in 36 different countries and all States and Territories around Australia. His wealth of experience and successful coaching background has held him in high demand for high performance sailing across all classes.

Beyer now has an industry reputation of commitment, productivity and success.

Cube Count: 78

Results

Sports NSW Master Athlete of 2015

Laser/ Masters States results
1st NSW State Masters Champion 2001
1st NSW State Masters Champion 2002
1st NSW State Masters Champion 2003
1st NSW State Masters Champion 2004
1st NSW State Masters Champion 2005
1st NSW State Masters Champion 2006
1st NSW State Masters Champion 2007
1st NSW State Masters Champion 2008
1st NSW State Masters Champion 2009
1st NSW State Masters Champion 2010
1st NSW State Masters Champion 2012
1st NSW State Masters Champion 2013
1st NSW State Masters Champion 2014
1st NSW State Masters Champion 2015
1st NSW State Masters Champion 2016
1st NSW State Masters Champion 2017
1st NSW State Masters Champion 2018
1st NSW State Masters Champion 2019

Australian Master National Championships
 1st Australian Masters National Championships 2011
 1st Australian Masters National Championships 2012, Brisabane, QLD, Aus
 1st Australian Masters National Championships 2014, Paynesville, VIC, Aus
 1st Australian Masters National Championships 2016, Port Stephens, NSW, Aus
 1st Australian Masters National Championships 2019, Devonport, Tasmania
 1st Australian Masters National Championships 2022, Westernport, Victoria

Other Championships
1st Flying Dutchman NSW State Championship 2003
4th Flying Dutchman Worlds 2004 Melbourne Australia
2nd 505 NSW State Championship 2010 Coffs Harbour

Laser NSW State Championships
1st NSW State Championships 1999
2nd NSW State Championships 2000
2nd NSW State Championships 2004
2nd NSW State Championships 2005
1st VIC State Championships 2006
1st NSW State Championships 2007
1st NSW State Championships 2009
1st NSW State Championships 2010
1st NSW Coastal Champion 2005
1st NSW Metropolitan Championship 2005
1st NSW Coastal Champion 2006
1st NSW Metropolitan Championship 2007
2nd Sail Melbourne Regatta 2007
1st NSW Coast Championship 2008
1st NSW Coast Championship 2011 Toronto NSW
1st NSW State Championships 2016 GRSC.

Laser Master World Championships
1st Laser World Masters Championships 2001, Cork,  Ireland.
2nd Laser World Masters Championships 2002, Hyannis, Cape Cod, USA.
3rd Laser World Masters Championships 2003, Cadiz, Spain.
1st Laser World Masters Championships 2004, Boderim, Turkey.
1st Laser World Masters Championships 2005, Fortaleza, Brazil.
1st Laser World Masters Championships 2006, JeJu, Korea.
1st Laser World Masters Championships 2007, Roses, Spain.
1st Laser World Masters Championships 2008, Terrigal, Australia.
2nd Laser World Masters Championships 2009, Nova Scotia, Canada.
1st Laser World Masters Championships 2010, Hayling Island, Hampshire, UK.
1st Laser World Masters Games 2010, Sydney, Australia.
2nd Laser World Masters Championships 2011, San Francisco, USA.
1st Laser World Masters Championships 2012, Brisbane, QLD Australia.
1st Laser World Masters Championships 2014, Hyeres, France.
1st Laser World Masters Championships 2015, Kingston, Canada.
1st Laser World Masters Championships 2016, Puerto Vallarta, Mexico.
1st Laser World Masters Championships 2017, Split, Croatia.
1st Laser World Masters Championships 2018, Dublin, Ireland.
2nd Laser World Masters Championships 2019, Port Zelande, Netherlands.
1st Laser World Masters Championships 2022, Puerto Vallarta, Mexico.
1st Laser World Masters Championships 2023, Pattaya, Thailand
 This is an unprecedented 15 World Championship wins from 18 attempts!

Notes

References 
 http://www.impropercourse.com/search/label/Brett%20Beyer (not my Blogsite)
 http://www.sail-world.com/Australia/2014-NSW-Sports-Awards---Nine-time-Laser-Masters-world-champion-wins/131871
 Sports NSW Awards
 https://www.youtube.com/watch?v=moQjoP0b4ZY    
 Flying Dutchman Worlds
 Yachting NSW Yachting Awards
 Pre-Worlds Media Release
 505 NSW title report by Ian Gregg Feb 2010
 SingaporeSailing Report
 http://www.pacificsailingschool.com.au_blog/our_sailing_news/post/hank_finishesin_top_10_masters

Australian male sailors (sport)
Living people
1966 births